Brusa is a genus of skippers in the family Hesperiidae.

Species
Brusa allardi Berger, 1967
Brusa saxicola Neave, 1910

References
Natural History Museum Lepidoptera genus database
Brusa at funet

Hesperiinae
Hesperiidae genera